John Edwin George, Jr. (November 13, 1928 – January 30, 1989) was an American professional basketball player.  He was born in the Pittsburgh suburb of Swissvale, Pennsylvania.

George attended St. John's College High School in Washington, D.C. He played basketball and baseball at La Salle University in the early 1950s.  He was selected by the Philadelphia Warriors in the 1953 National Basketball Association Draft and played eight seasons in the league with the Warriors and New York Knicks.  Among the highlights of his NBA career were his NBA Championship with the Warriors in 1956 and his NBA All-Star Game appearances in 1956 and 1957.  The 6'2" guard ranked within the NBA's top ten in assists per game six times throughout his career and led the league in total minutes played (2,840) in 1955–56.

NBA career statistics

Regular season

Playoffs

See also
List of National Basketball Association annual minutes leaders

External links
Career statistics
La Salle Hall of Athletes profile

1928 births
1989 deaths
People from Swissvale, Pennsylvania
American men's basketball players
Basketball players from Pennsylvania
Guards (basketball)
La Salle Explorers men's basketball players
National Basketball Association All-Stars
New York Knicks players
Philadelphia Warriors draft picks
Philadelphia Warriors players
Sportspeople from the Pittsburgh metropolitan area